Liu Yingke (died 174 BC) was a nephew of Emperor Gaozu of Han, son of Liu Jiao, Prince Yuan of Chu. After his father died in 178 BC, he succeeded as Prince Yi of Chu.  In 174 BC, Yingke died of a sudden illness, and his son Liu Wu inherited the principality from him. Liu Wu later became involved in the Rebellion of the Seven States.

References

174 BC deaths
Han dynasty imperial princes
Year of birth unknown